Ncediwe Faith Nobevu-Booi (died 20 July 2021) was a South African politician who represented the African National Congress (ANC) in the Eastern Cape Provincial Legislature from May 2019 until her death in July 2021. She was elected to her legislative seat in the 2019 general election, ranked 32nd on the ANC's provincial party list.  

She died in a car accident on 20 July 2021. Her seat in the legislature was filled by Kesava Pillai Anikumar the following month.

References

External links 

 

20th-century births
2021 deaths
African National Congress politicians
Members of the Eastern Cape Provincial Legislature
21st-century South African politicians
Year of birth missing
21st-century South African women politicians
Road incident deaths in South Africa